Menzies Creek railway station was opened with the line on 18 December 1900. It was named after an early settler John Menzies. On 5 December 1904 it was renamed Aura, after the estate of the Shire President. The station reverted to its previous name on 4 July 1947. Throughout this period, the Post Office kept the name of the town as Menzies Creek which it remains to this day.

When the station was operating under the Victorian Railways it had a loop siding, a standard portable station building, and a goods shed.  As the original station building had long been demolished, a replacement building of reclaimed Victorian Railways' "portables" was built in the 1980s. In 1990 the station buildings was moved to its current position as an island platform during a construction exercise undertaken by combat engineers of the 7th Field Engineer Regiment (Australian Army Reserve).

These days, Menzies Creek has an island crossing platform with a track on each side, a loop siding and also a siding into the museum.  The station now is home to the "Aura Tearooms", the Puffing Billy Narrow Gauge Museum, and also boasts a Signal bay containing a 14-lever interlocking frame.

Gallery

External links
 Melway map at street-directory.com.au

Tourist railway stations in Melbourne
Railway stations in the Shire of Yarra Ranges